Bo Bendsneyder (born 4 March 1999) is a Dutch motorcycle racer. He was the Red Bull MotoGP Rookies Cup champion in 2015.

Career

Moto3 World Championship

Red Bull KTM Ajo (2016–2017)
In 2016 he made his debut in the Moto3 class, Riding for the Red Bull KTM Ajo team. He got two podiums (Great Britain and Malaysia) and closed the season in fourteenth place in the riders' championship standings with 78 points.

In 2017 he stayed with the same team. His best result was a fourth place in the Czech Republic and ended the season in fifteenth place in the riders' championship standings with 65 points.

Moto2 World Championship

Tech 3 Racing (2018)
In 2018 he moved to Moto2 with  Tech 3. He concluded the season in 29th place with 2 points, his best finish was fourteenth place in Thailand.
During the 2018 Japanese Grand Prix he suffered a broken tibia due to flying shrapnel from an engine explosion on the last lap of the race.

NTS RW Racing GP (2019–2020)
In 2019 he moved to NTS. He got his best result of the season a thirteenth place in the Grand Prix of the Americas and ended the season in 26th place with 7 points.

In 2020 he stayed with the same team. His best result was an eighth place in Valencia and he ended the season in 23rd place with 18 points.

Pertamina Mandalika SAG Team (2021–present)
Bendsneyder will race in the 2021 Moto2 World Championship for the Pertamina Mandalika SAG Racing Team.

Career statistics

Red Bull MotoGP Rookies Cup

Races by year
(key) (Races in bold indicate pole position, races in italics indicate fastest lap)

Grand Prix motorcycle racing

By season

By class

Races by year
(key) (Races in bold indicate pole position; races in italics indicate fastest lap)

References

External links

1999 births
Living people
Dutch motorcycle racers
Moto3 World Championship riders
Sportspeople from Rotterdam
Moto2 World Championship riders
21st-century Dutch people